The fire lance was a gunpowder weapon and the ancestor of modern firearms. It first appeared in 10th–12th century China and was used to great effect during the Jin-Song Wars. It began as a small pyrotechnic device attached to a polearm weapon, used to gain a shock advantage at the start of a melee. As gunpowder improved, the explosive discharge was increased, and debris or pellets added, giving it some of the effects of a combination modern flamethrower and shotgun, but with a very short range (about ), and only one shot (some were designed for two shots). By the late 13th century, fire lance barrels had transitioned to metal material to better withstand the explosive blast, and the lance-point was discarded in favor of relying solely on the gunpowder blast. These became the first hand cannons.

Design 

The first fire lances consisted of a tube, usually bamboo, containing gunpowder and a slow match, strapped to a spear or other polearm weapon. Once ignited, the gunpowder tube would ideally eject a stream of flames in the direction of the spearhead. Projectiles such as iron pellets or pottery shards were later added to the gunpowder. Upon firing, the gunpowder charge ejected the projectiles along with the flame.

Metal fire lance barrels appeared around the mid-13th century and these began to be used independently of the lance itself. The independent metal barrel was known as an 'eruptor' and became the forerunner of the hand cannon.

In Europe, versions with wooden tubes were used.

History

China
The earliest evidence of fire lances appeared in China in the year 950. However usage of fire lances in warfare was not mentioned until 1132 when Song garrisons used them during the Siege of De'an, in modern-day Anlu, Hubei, in a sortie against the Jin dynasty (1115–1234).

In 1163 fire lances were attached to war carts known as "at-your-desire-carts" used to defend mobile firebomb trebuchets.

In the late 1100s pieces of shrapnel such as porcelain shards and small iron pellets were added to the gunpowder tube. At some point fire lances discarded the spearhead altogether and relied solely on their firepower.

By 1232 the Jin were also using fire lances, but with improved reusable barrels consisting of durable paper material. According to the History of Jin, these fire lances had a range of roughly three meters:

In 1233, Jin soldiers used fire lances successfully against the Mongols. Pucha Guannu led 450 Jin fire lancers and routed an entire Mongol encampment. The Mongol soldiers were apparently disdainful of other Jin weapons, but greatly feared the fire lance.

In 1259 a pellet wad that occluded the barrel was recorded to have been used as a fire lance projectile, making it the first recorded bullet in history.

By 1276 fire lances had transitioned to metal barrels. Fire lances were also being used by cavalrymen at this point, as evidenced by the account of a Song-Yuan battle in which two fire lance armed Song cavalrymen rushed a Chinese officer of Bayan of the Baarin. The Huolongjing also mentions a gourd fire lance which was used by cavalrymen as well as foot soldiers.

The metal-barreled fire lance began to be used independently of the lance around the mid to late 13th century. These proto-cannons which fired co-viative projectiles, known as 'eruptors,' were the forerunners of the hand cannon.

Later history
By 1280 the Middle East had acquired fire lances.

In 1396 European knights took up fire lances as mounted weapons.

In 15th century Japanese samurai used fire lances.

The last recorded usage of fire lances in Europe occurred during the Storming of Bristol in 1643 although the Commonwealth of England was still issuing them to ships in 1660.

Troncks

Versions where the fireworks and shot were placed in a wooden tube at the end of a pole were known as Troncks, fire-trunks or bombas in Europe. The fireworks had alternating slow and fast burning sections.

They were frequently issued to warships and a surviving example was found in the wreck of the La Trinidad Valencera. Testing of an attempted reconstruction was carried out in 1988. During the test multiple sections of the Tronck ignited at once.

Gallery

See also 
 Early modern warfare
 Science and technology of the Song dynasty
 Jiao Yu
 Huolongjing
 Xun Lei Chong

Citations

References
 
 
 
 .
 
 
 .
 
 .
 
 .
 
 .
 .
 .
 
 
 .
 Hadden, R. Lee. 2005. "Confederate Boys and Peter Monkeys." Armchair General. January 2005. Adapted from a talk given to the Geological Society of America on March 25, 2004.
 
 .
 .
 
 .
 .
 
 
 
 .
 
 

 
 
 
 .
 
 
 .
 
 
 .
 .
 
 .
 .
 
 .
 
 
 
 
 
 Schmidtchen, Volker (1977a), "Riesengeschütze des 15. Jahrhunderts. Technische Höchstleistungen ihrer Zeit", Technikgeschichte 44 (2): 153–173 (153–157)
 Schmidtchen, Volker (1977b), "Riesengeschütze des 15. Jahrhunderts. Technische Höchstleistungen ihrer Zeit", Technikgeschichte 44 (3): 213–237 (226–228)
 .
 .
 
 .

External links 
 Little Bit of Info on the Fire Lance
 Medieval Chinese Armies, 1260-1520 (Men-at-arms S.) by Chris J. Peers. 
 Chinese Siege Warfare: Mechanical Artillery & Siege Weapons of Antiquity

Chinese inventions
Combination weapons
Early firearms
Firearms of China
Military history of the Song dynasty